Robert de Visée (c. 1655 – 1732/1733) was a French lutenist, guitarist, theorbist and viol player at the court of the kings Louis XIV and Louis XV, as well as a singer and composer for lute, theorbo and guitar.

Biography
Robert de Visée's place and date of birth are unknown. He probably knew Francesco Corbetta and would have been familiar with his music.  claimed that he studied with Corbetta and this information has been repeated uncritically in later sources including Strizich and Ledbetter 2001. It is however unsupported by any documentary evidence . He is first mentioned (by Le Gallois) in 1680, and at about that time became a chamber musician to Louis XIV, in which capacity he often performed at court. In 1709 he was appointed as a singer in the royal chamber, and in 1719 he was named 'Guitar Master of the King' (Maître de Guitare du Roi) to Louis XV, the ten-year-old great-grandson of Louis XIV who succeeded to the throne in 1715. Jean Rousseau reported in a letter of 1688 that Visée was a respected musician at Versailles, and also played the viol . The last payment in his name in state documents is dated 1732. It is to be assumed that he died about that time.

Works
Visée published two books of guitar music that contain twelve suites between them, as well as a few separate pieces: Livre de guitare dédié au roi (Paris, 1682) and Livre de pièces pour la guitare (Paris, 1686). He also published a collection of pieces for the theorbo and lute: Pièces de théorbe et de luth (Paris, 1716); these are in staff notation rather than tablature and may also be performed as ensemble pieces. He composed many other pieces for theorbo and Baroque lute (the bulk of which are preserved in the Saizenay Ms.).

Complete list of de Visée's pieces for the guitar:
1682 Livre de Guitarre, dédie au roi:
Suite No. 1 in A Minor: Prélude – Allemande – Courante – Sarabande – Gigue – Passacaille – Gavotte – Gavotte – Bourrée
Suite No. 2 in A Major: Allemande – Courante – Sarabande
Suite No. 3 in D Minor: Prélude – Allemande – Courante – Courante – Sarabande – Sarabande – Gigue – Passacaille – Gavotte – Gavotte – Menuet Rondeau – Menuet Rondeau – Bourrée
Suite No. 4 in G Minor: Prélude – Allemande – Courante – Double de la Courante – Sarabande – Gigue – Menuet – Gavotte
Suite No. 5 in G Major: Sarabande – Sarabande – Gigue
Suite No. 6 in C Minor: Prélude – Tombeau de Mr. Francisque Corbet – Courante – Sarabande – Sarabande en Rondeau – Gavotte
Suite No. 7 in C Major: Prélude – Allemande – Courante – Sarabande – Gigue, a la Maniere Angloise – Gavotte – Menuet
Chaconne (F Major)
Suite No. 8 in G Major: Prélude – (Accord Nouveau) – Allemande – Courante – Sarabande – Gigue – Sarabande – Chaconne – Gavotte – Menuet – Bourrée
1686 Livre de Pieces pour la Guitarre:
Suite No. 9 in D Minor: Prélude – Allemande – Courante – Sarabande – Gigue – Gavotte – Bourrée – Menuet – Passacaille – Menuet
Suite No. 10 in G Minor: Prélude – Allemande – Courante – Sarabande – Gigue – Menuet – Chaconne – Gavotte – Bourrée – Menuet
Sarabande (A Minor)
Gigue (A Minor)
Sarabande (A Major)
Menuet (A Major)
Suite No. 11 in B Minor: Prélude – Allemande – Sarabande – Gigue – Passacaille
Suite No. 12 in E Minor: Sarabande – Menuet – Passacaille
Menuet (C Major)
Manuscript Pieces:
Pieces in A minor
Prélude
Allemande
Villanelle (& Contrepartie)
Pieces in A major
Prélude
Rondeau
Pieces in C major	
Courante
Gigue
Pieces in D minor
Allemande 'La Royalle'
Sarabande
Masquerade
Gigue
Gavotte
Chaconne
Pieces in D major
Sarabande
Gavotte
Chaconne
Gavotte Rondeau (& Contrepartie)
Pieces in G minor
Prélude
Prélude
Allemande
Sarabande
Gavotte
Gavotte en Rondeau
Ouverture de la Grotte De Versaille (de Lully)
Entrée d’Appollon (de Lully)
Pieces in G major
Allemande
Courante
Sarabande
Gigue
Gigue
Musette (Rondeau)

Sources

External links

1650s births
1730s deaths
17th-century classical composers
18th-century classical composers
French Baroque composers
Composers for lute
Composers for the classical guitar
French classical musicians
French classical guitarists
French lutenists
French classical composers
French male classical composers
French male guitarists
18th-century French composers
18th-century French male musicians
17th-century male musicians